Rudić is a Serbo-Croatian surname, derived from rud(o), meaning "ore". Notable people with the surname include:

Ratko Rudić (born 1948), Croatian water polo coach and a former Yugoslav water polo player.
Marko Rudić (born 1990), Bosnian alpine skier.
Teodora Rudić (born 1998), Serbian female water polo player.
Ivo Rudić (1942–2009), Croatian-Australian footballer.
Boglarka Rudić (born 1991), Serbian female water polo player.
Vladan Rudić, Montenegrin volleyballer.

See also
Rudic (surname)

Serbian surnames
Croatian surnames